Jack Grimes may refer to:
 Jack Grimes (actor) (1926–2009), American actor
 Jack Grimes (footballer) (born 1989), Australian rules footballer

See also
John Grimes (disambiguation)